Nathan Kuppermann is an American pediatrician and professor in the Departments of Emergency Medicine and Pediatrics at UC Davis School of Medicine. where he holds the Bo Tomas Brofeldt Endowed Chair. He is the former chair of the International Pediatric Emergency Research Network (PERN) and is a Member of the National Academy of Medicine.

Education 
Kuppermann received his B.SC in Biology at Stanford University. He completed his Doctorate in Medicine at the University of California, San Francisco School of Medicine and continued on to Harvard University, School of Public Health for his Masters in Public Health

Academic work 
He is both a pediatric emergency physician and clinical epidemiologist. Kuppermann has been a federally-funded investigator for many years and has particular interests in the clinical efficiency and utility of laboratory testing in the setting of the Pediatric Emergency Department. His research has specially emphasized  the laboratory evaluation of young febrile children, evaluation of children at risk of diabetic ketoacidosis-related cerebral edema and laboratory and radiographic evaluation of the pediatric trauma patient.

Professional service
Kuppermann served as Chair of the Steering Committee of the Pediatric Emergency Care Applied Research Network (PECARN) since its inception in 2001 until late in 2008. This network is funded by HRSA/MCHB and EMSC and consists of 22 geographically and demographically diverse hospital pediatric emergency departments which evaluate ~ 900,000 children annually.  Most recently, he completed a 25-center study of 45,000 head injured children in PECARN to create and validate a decision rule for emergency neuroimaging of these children

References 

Harvard School of Public Health alumni
Members of the National Academy of Medicine
University of California, Davis faculty
University of California, San Francisco alumni
21st-century American physicians
American pediatricians
Year of birth missing (living people)
Living people
American epidemiologists
American emergency physicians